The phrase Summer of __ can refer to:

Film and television
Summer of '42, a 1971 American coming-of-age film based on Herman Raucher's memoirs
"The Summer of George", a 1997 episode of the sitcom Seinfeld
My Summer of Love, a 2004 British film directed by Pawel Pawlikowski
Summer of Fear (disambiguation), the theatrical release title of the 1978 television movie Stranger in Our House
Summer of Aviya, an Israeli biopic based on actress Gila Almagor's autobiography
Summer of the Monkeys, a 1998 film based on the children's novel of the same name
Summer of Sam, a 1999 Spike Lee film about the Son of Sam serial killings

Books
Summer of Night, a 1991 horror novel by American writer Dan Simmons
Summer of Secrets, a 2007 novel by Rosie Rushton
Summer of the Monkeys, a 1976 children's novel by Wilson Rawls
Summer of the Swans, a 1970 novel by Betsy Byars

Music
Summer of '69, a 1984 song by Bryan Adams
Summer of '78, a 1996 album by singer-songwriter Barry Manilow
Summer of Darkness, a 2004 album by American metalcore band Demon Hunter

Events
Summer of Love, a 1967 social phenomenon connected with American hippie counterculture
Summer of the Shark, a sensationalist term used by American media to describe a 2001 shark attack
Google Summer of Code, an annual coding project sponsored by Google
Summer of Sonic, an annual convention for fans of Sonic the Hedgehog